This article displays the qualifying draw of the 2011 BNP Paribas Masters.

Players

Seeds

Qualifiers

Lucky loser
  Igor Kunitsyn

Qualifying draw

First qualifier

Second qualifier

Third qualifier

Fourth qualifier

Fifth qualifier

Sixth qualifier

References
 Qualifying Draw

2011 - qualifying
BNP Paribas Masters - qualifying
Qualification for tennis tournaments